Gerrit Willem Dijsselhof (1866 – 1924), was a Dutch painter involved in the arts and crafts movement.

Biography
He was born in Zwollerkerspel and studied first at the art academy in The Hague, but moved to Amsterdam in 1884 to follow lessons at the arts and crafts school.	
He was a member of Natura Artis Magistra and especially enjoyed watching their new aquarium which opened in 1882.  He spent many afternoons after his studies at the art academy there sketching and painting the fish in watercolours.  From 1897 he worked on furniture design for the firm E.J. van Wisselingh & Co., Amsterdam. He married the textile artist Willy Keuchenius.

He died in Overveen.

References

External links

Gerrit Willem Dijsselhof on Artnet	
	

1866 births
1924 deaths
People from Zwolle
19th-century Dutch painters
Dutch male painters
20th-century Dutch painters
19th-century Dutch male artists
20th-century Dutch male artists